The Trinidad and Tobago women's national under-16 and under-17 basketball team is a national basketball team of Trinidad and Tobago, administered by the National Basketball Federation of Trinidad and Tobago.

It represents the country in international under-16 and under-17 (under age 16 and under age 17) women's basketball competitions.

It appeared at the 2016 CBC U16 Championship for Women.

See also
Trinidad and Tobago women's national basketball team
Trinidad and Tobago women's national under-19 basketball team
Trinidad and Tobago men's national under-17 basketball team

References

External links
Trinidad and Tobago Basketball Records at FIBA Archive

Basketball in Trinidad and Tobago
Basketball teams in Trinidad and Tobago
Women's national under-17 basketball teams
Basketball